Riding the Wave is a debut album by The Blanks released in 2004 on CD and as a digital download.

Overview
Riding the Wave features both original songs by the band and cover versions of other songs, most of which were performed on the TV series Scrubs. It also features candid recordings of the cast and production team of Scrubs (marked on the track listing as CR). Sam Lloyd was written into the script for the all 9 seasons of Scrubs. The album cover jokes that these recordings are "used without [the cast and crew's] knowledge or permission".

Track listing
 "Superman" (Chad Fischer / Tim Bright / Chris Link) – 3:20
Lazlo Bane cover
 "Charles in Charge" (theme tune from the sitcom) – 1:01
 "A Little Polish"
 "They'll Never Know" – CR
 "Touched Up" – CR (Judy Reyes)
 "Play On" – CR (Robert Maschio)
 "Testy Tiger"
 "Commandos (Attack!)"
 "Good Old Days"
 "Crowded Landscape" – CR (John C. McGinley)
 "Holy" – CR (Sarah Chalke)
 "Elliot in Your Cup"
 CD edition only
 "By Mennen – G major"
 CD edition only
 "Happy Halloween"
 "The Full Monty"
 "Testy Tiger – reprise"
 "What Now?" – CR (Ken Jenkins)
 "I'm in the Middle" – CR (Donald Faison)
 "Facts of Life" (theme tune from the sitcom)
 "By Mennen – D major"
 CD edition only
 "Flipper Theme" (theme tune from the TV series)
 "Speed Racer" (theme tune from the anime series)
 "The Riff Song" (originally from The Desert Song operetta)
 "John Fredrich" – CR  (Christa Miller)
 "Do You Want?" – CR (Aloma Wright)
 "If You Never Looked at Me" – CR(Zach Braff)
 "Boing Fwip"
 "Underdog" (theme tune from the animated series)
 "Six Million Dollar Man" (theme tune from the TV series)
 "Testy Tiger – additional reprise"
 "Love Having You" – CR (Bill Lawrence)
 "I'll Be Seeing You" (from the 1944 movie)
 "The Ballad of Jimmy Durante"
 "Back To You" – CR (Neil Flynn)

References

External links 
 

2004 albums
Albums produced by Chad Fischer
Scrubs (TV series)